Michael Colin Tepper (born December 11, 1985) is an American football offensive tackle in the National Football League. He is a free agent. He has played for the Dallas Cowboys, Indianapolis Colts, and Kansas City Chiefs. He played college football for the California Golden Bears.

Mike Tepper was born in Long Beach, California and grew up in Cypress, California where he attended St. Hedwig Catholic private school. He grew up playing AYSO soccer (11 years). He attended Pacifica High School in Garden Grove, California where he transitioned to American Football. While at Pacifica, he played Football, Men's Volleyball, and Track and Field.

While at Pacifica HS, he became recognized for his athletic talents in American Football and was selected and awarded All-League (2001,2002,2003), All-CIF (2002, 2003), All-Far West (2003), and All-American (2003). He was later selected to Orange County's All-Decade team in 2010/11.

References

1985 births
Living people
American football offensive tackles
Indianapolis Colts players
California Golden Bears football players